The 1999 Singapore Challenge, also known as the 1999 Coca-Cola Singapore Challenge for sponsorship reasons was a One Day International cricket tournament which took place between 2–8 September 1999. The tournament was held in Singapore. The tournament was won by the West Indies who defeated India by 4 wickets.

Teams

Squads

Fixtures

Group stage

Points Table

Matches

Final

Statistics

See also

2000 Singapore Challenge

References

External links
1999 Singapore Challenge at ESPN Cricinfo

1999 in Singaporean sport
International cricket competitions from 1997–98 to 2000
One Day International cricket competitions
International cricket competitions in Singapore